Mohammad Sadeghi (born May 30, 1957) is an Iranian actor.

Biography 
Born in Mashhad, Sadeghi moved to the US to go to university after finishing high school. He studied Media and Communication and continued his studies to obtain his PhD at Wisconsin State University. Sadeghi also took several acting classes in the US before returning to Iran. In 1995, he finally made his movie debut with “Deadly Escape.“ He has since appeared in several movies and dramas including “Abraham The Friend of God”, “House of Outsiders”, “A Place for Love”, “Half Awake”, Reign of Love, “Lost Paradise” and “Scream in Silence”.

Television 
Reign of Love (2000)
The Green Star (2004)
Abraham: The Friend of God (2008)
Mokhtarnameh (2010-2011)

References 
 Mohammad Sadeghi his biography
 Mohammad Sadeghi in imdb & sourehcinema
 

1957 births
Living people
People from Tehran
Iranian male film actors
Iranian male television actors